General Hopkins may refer to:

Caleb Hopkins (colonel) (1770–1818), New York Militia brigadier general
Frederic Williams Hopkins (1806–1874), Vermont Militia adjutant general
Ronald Hopkins (1897–1990), Australian Army major general
Samuel Hopkins (congressman) (1753–1819), U.S. Army major general